Aunque me Cueste la Vida (English title:Though It Might Cost Me My Life) is a Venezuelan telenovela written by Salvador Garmendia and Martín Hahn and produced by Radio Caracas Televisión in 1998. This telenovela ran for 126 episodes and was distributed internationally by RCTV International.

Roxana Diaz and Carlos Montilla star as the main protagonists with Julie Restifo, Franklin Virgüez and Catherine Correia as the antagonists.

Synopsis
On the day of the Festival Of The Moon, a gypsy predicts that the soulful heiress Teresa Larrazabal will meet three men. The mystical ”spell of the stardust” will unmask one who will help her, one who will destroy her and one who will be the love of her life. But the spell undergoes a sinister twist at the hands of the embittered Belgica Michelena. She casts a terrible sentence on the innocence of true love, hurling Teresa toward an unwilling fate as her pawn in a mysterious game of seduction, sorcery and revenge.

Belgica unites a powerful hatred for Teresa’s father Teofilo, the lover who spurned her, with the power of the gypsy’s incantation. But her plan to use sons, Vicente and Pedro Armando, as instruments of her vengeance goes awry when Vicente falls in love with Teresa, challenging both his mother and the supernatural forces that oppose them. It is decreed that Vicente will die if Teresa surrenders to his love. Defiant in their quest to resist Belgica’s depravity, Teresa and Vicente join hands and hearts to undo the evil of the prophecy.

As they weave their way through the darkness of the Magic Forest, the full moon’s piercing rays illuminate their paths, helping them to discover the secret that will free them. In their journey to vanquish destiny’s wicked intentions, they affirm that true love weaves the most powerful spell of all.

Cast
Carlos Montilla as Vicente Valbuena Michelena
Roxana Diaz as Teresa Larrazábal
Franklin Vírgüez as Don Teófilo Larrazába
Gledys Ibarra as Porcia Larrazába
Julie Restifo as Belgica Michelena
Carlota Sosa as Blanca
Catherine Correia as Julia Larrazába
Winston Vallenilla as Pedro Armando Reverón
Juan Carlos Alarcón as Modesto  
Ricardo Bianchi as Edmundo Berrisveitia 
Nacarid Escalona as Elida
Alfonso Medina as Polonio
Dalila Colombo as Martirio Larrazabal

Trivia
 The theme song to Aunque me Cueste la Vida is "Como un Hechizo", performed by Carlos Montilla.
 Belgica Michelena was the basis for Tatum O'Neal's character in the MyNetworkTV serial Wicked Wicked Games.
 Same song title written by Alberto "Negrito Del Batey" Beltran, of the Dominican Republic, in the 60s.

References

External links
Aunque me Cueste la Vida at the Internet Movie Database
Opening Credits

1998 telenovelas
RCTV telenovelas
Venezuelan telenovelas
1998 Venezuelan television series debuts
1998 Venezuelan television series endings
1990s Venezuelan television series
Spanish-language telenovelas
Television shows set in Caracas